Kerby Alonzo Miller (born December 30, 1944) is an American historian and emeritus professor at University of Missouri.

Life
Miller graduated from Pomona College, and from University of California, Berkeley, with an MA and PhD in 1976.
He is a visiting researcher at Queen's University Belfast.

He has argued extensively that historian Richard J. Jensen's claims about anti-Irish sentiment in America were inaccurate.

Miller collected and transcribed over decades hundreds of letters from Irish immigrants in America. The letters range in date from the late 1600s to the 1950s. He deposited transcripts of these letters at the Moore Institute, NUI Galway to be made available on a searchable database.

Awards
 1986 Pulitzer Prize in History finalist
 1986 Theodore Saloutos Award
 1986 Merle Curti Award from the Organization of American Historians
 2002 Distinguished Lecturer by the Organization of American Historians
 2004 James S. Donnelly Prize for Irish Immigrants in the Land of Canaan

Works

Chapters

Books
 
 
 
 
 Out of Ireland: The Story of Irish Emigration to America (Washington, DC, 1994), 
   (reprint 1988 )

References

External links
 Kerby Miller Papers at Tamiment Library and Robert F. Wagner Labor Archives at New York University Special Collections

1944 births
Pomona College alumni
University of California, Berkeley alumni
University of Missouri faculty
Living people
21st-century American historians
21st-century American male writers
Historians from California
American male non-fiction writers